The Lotto Cross Cup is an annual series of international cross country running competitions in Belgium. The inaugural season was in 1982–1983. The series comprises Belgium's foremost cross country competitions, including the IAAF permit meeting in Brussels (Lotto Cross Cup Brussels) and the European Athletics sanctioned meeting in Roeselare (Lotto Cross Cup van West-Vlaanderen) – Belgium's only world and European level meetings.

The series previously featured six meetings (legs), but this expanded after 2003 and by 2009 the series had eight competitions in its schedule. The series typically begins in October and concludes in March. Throughout the series, athletes can earn points based on their performance, ranging from 25 points for first place and one point for fifteenth place. These points are then combined at the end of the series and the male and female athletes with the greatest totals are declared the winners.

In addition to the main men's and women's senior races, there are junior, masters and student competitions, as well as an under-23s competition sponsored by EuroMillions. There are also short-course cross country competitions, which are worth half the prize money of the longer races.

The series attracts mainly Belgian athletes, although British athlete Roger Hackney won the men's series in the 1988–89 edition. Furthermore, the meetings in Brussels, Roeselare and Hannut often attract many high-calibre international athletes.

Competitions

Past series winners

References
General
Palmares . Lotto Cross Cup. Retrieved on 2010-02-06.
Specific

External links
Crosscup (in Dutch)

Cross country running competitions
Athletics in Belgium
Recurring sporting events established in 1982
Annual athletics series
Cross country running in Belgium
Annual sporting events in Belgium
1982 establishments in Belgium